Speak!!!! is the third album from The Mad Capsule Markets. The album  was recorded in England. Two songs were featured from the original Berrie recording. The album displayed a more experimental and darker side to their music, evident in the closing song "Kachiku". It was also their first album to have a full English song ("Solid State Survivor", originally by YMO).

Track listing

"Public Revolution"

"Underground Face"
"Solid States Survivor"

"Care-Less Virus"

"4 Junk 2 Pop"
"D-Day"
"Government Wall"

Charts

References

The Mad Capsule Markets albums
1992 albums